Gennifer is a given name. Notable people with the given name include:

Gennifer Brandon (born 1990), American basketball player
Gennifer Choldenko (born 1957), American writer
Gennifer Flowers (born 1950), American model
Gennifer Hutchison (born 1977), American television writer

See also
 Jennifer (given name)